Friedrich von Sallet (20 April 1812 – 21 February 1843) was a German writer, most notable for his political and religion-critiquing poems.

Biography
Von Sallet was born in Neiße. He attacked military events of the time in several satirical works.  He died in Reichau bei Niemcza, Landkreis Strehlen (Silesia).

Family
His sister, Marie Bloede, married the physician Gustav Bloede.  They emigrated to the United States in the aftermath of the Revolutions of 1848 in Germany.  Their son Victor Gustav Bloede became a noted chemist there.

External links
 

1812 births
1843 deaths
German poets
German satirists
German male poets
19th-century poets
19th-century German writers
19th-century German male writers
German male non-fiction writers